"Love of My Life" is a song written and performed by American singer-songwriter Carly Simon, featured in 1992 Nora Ephron film This Is My Life, and it's accompanying soundtrack album.

As a single, it reached the top 20 on the Billboard Adult Contemporary chart, peaking at No. 16. It has been featured on multiple compilations of Simon's work, such as the three-disc box set Clouds in My Coffee (1995), the two-disc retrospective Anthology (2002), and the single-disc Reflections: Carly Simon's Greatest Hits (2004). Simon made a music video for the song, which featured her son Ben Taylor, along with clips from the film.

Composition and lullaby version
Writer/director Nora Ephron called Simon in 1991 and asked her to score her upcoming film This Is My Life. Ephron told her, "It's 'our story', about the tricky business of raising children and maintaining a solid career, without the benefit of a live-in father". Simon has stated the inspiration for the song was her children, Ben Taylor and Sally Taylor.

Simon re-recorded the song as a lullaby version for her 2007 album Into White. In this version, she altered the names in the first verse from "Woody Allen" to "Mia Farrow", and removed the third verse altogether.

Track listing
CD single
 "Love of My Life" (Radio Version) – 3:35

Charts

References

External links
Carly Simon's Official Website

1990s ballads
1992 songs
Songs written by Carly Simon
Carly Simon songs
1992 singles
Pop ballads
Songs written for films